Argentina georgei is a species of fish in the family Argentinidae found in the western Atlantic Ocean along the coasts of Florida, the Caribbean islands and Central America where it occurs at depths of from .  This species grows to a length of  SL.

References
Kent E. Carpenter, The Living Marine Resources of the Western Central Atlantic, Volume 2 Bony fishes part 1 (Acipenseridae to Grammatidae), ISSN 1020-6868.
 

Argentinidae
Fish of the Atlantic Ocean
Fish described in 1969